The 2014 Louisiana–Lafayette Ragin' Cajuns softball team represented the University of Louisiana at Lafayette in the 2014 NCAA Division I softball season. The Ragin' Cajuns played their home games at Lamson Park and were led by fourteenth year head coach Michael Lotief.

Preseason

Sun Belt Conference Coaches Poll
The Sun Belt Conference Coaches Poll was released on February 3, 2014. Louisiana-Lafayette was picked to finish first in the Sun Belt Conference with 62 votes and 6 first place votes.

Preseason All-Sun Belt team
Jordan Wallace (ULL, JR, Pitcher)
Hannah Campbell (USA, SR, Pitcher)
Callie Alford (GSU, JR, Catcher)
Kacie McAllister (TROY, SR, 1st Base)
Olivia Watkins (WKU, SR, 2nd Base)
Preslie Cruce (WKU, JR, 3rd Base)
Kaitlyn Griffin (USA, JR, Shortstop)
Shellie Landry (ULL, SO, Outfield)
Blair Johnson (USA, JR, Outfield)
Jessica Clifton (GSU, SR, Outfield)
Sara Corbello (ULL, SO, Designated Player)
Emily Rousseau (WKU, SR, Pitcher At-Large)
Nina Villanueva (UTA, JR, Shortstop At-Large)
Callie Alford (GSU, JR, 3rd Base At-Large)
Britnea Barilli (UTA, SO, Outfield At-Large)

Sun Belt Preseason Pitcher of the Year
Jordan Wallace (ULL, JR, Pitcher)

Roster

Coaching staff

Schedule and results

Lafayette Regional

Lafayette Super Regional

Women's College World Series

References

Louisiana
Louisiana Ragin' Cajuns softball seasons
Louisiana softball
Women's College World Series seasons